An investment company is a financial institution principally engaged in holding, managing and investing securities. These companies in the United States are regulated by the U.S. Securities and Exchange Commission and must be registered under the Investment Company Act of 1940. Investment companies invest money on behalf of their clients who, in return, share in the profits and losses.

Investment companies are designed for long-term investment, not short-term trading.

Investment companies do not include brokerage companies, insurance companies, or banks.

In United States securities law, there are at least three types of investment companies:
 Open-End Management Investment Companies (mutual funds)
Face amount certificates companies: very rare.
Management companies
 Closed-End Management Investment Companies (closed-end funds)
 UITs (unit investment trusts): only issue redeemable units.

In general, each of these investment companies must register under the Securities Act of 1933 and the Investment Company Act of 1940. A fourth and lesser-known type of investment company under the Investment Company Act of 1940 is a Face-Amount Certificate Company. A major type of company not covered under the Investment Company Act 1940 is private investment companies, which are simply private companies that make investments in stocks or bonds, but are limited to under 250 investors and are not regulated by the SEC. These funds are often composed of very wealthy investors.

See also
 Holding company
 Investment trust
 Private equity firm

References

 
Investment management
Types of business entity